James Goodwin Forest is a  managed forest near Carthage, North Carolina.  The forest is managed by the NC Natural Resources Foundation for NC State University's Department of Forestry and Environmental Resources.

References

External links 
 Website for the NCSU Department of Forestry and Environmental Resources

Forests of North Carolina
Protected areas of Moore County, North Carolina